Bois-de-la-Pierre is a commune in the Haute-Garonne department in southwestern France. According to the 2018 census the commune had a population of 437.

Geography
The commune is bordered by five other communes: Bérat to the north, Longages to the northwest, Peyssies across the river Louge to the southeast, Gratens to the southwest, and finally by Labastide-Clermont to the west.

The river Louge flows through the commune, forming a border with Peyssies.

Population

See also
Communes of the Haute-Garonne department

References

Communes of Haute-Garonne